Cinema Scope is an English-language film magazine published in Toronto, Canada.

History and profile 
Cinema Scope has been published since 1999 with articles on world cinema. The magazine has compiled a list of the top 10 films of each year.

Mark Peranson, the magazine's editor, was awarded the Clyde Gilmour Award by the Toronto Film Critics Association in 2009.

Annual Top 10 Lists

References

External links
 

1999 establishments in Canada
Film magazines published in Canada
English-language magazines
Quarterly magazines published in Canada
Magazines established in 1999
Magazines published in Toronto